Australian Bird of the Year is a biennial poll organised by The Guardian Australia. Members of the public are invited to vote for their favourite Australian bird in an online poll.

Winners

References 

Competitions in Australia